Eheim GmbH & Co. KG is a German company founded by Gunther Eheim, operating in the domain of aquariums and aquarium accessories, garden ponds and related accessories. It manufactures different kinds of water filters (internal and external) and the associated filter media, pumps, accessories such as aquarium fish feeders, gravel cleaners, UV-clarifier for aquariums and garden ponds, while its subsidiaries MP (Mueller and Pfleger) manufacture aquariums and Jäger, aquarium heaters. The latest innovation from EHEIM is an external canister filter with WiFi connection and monitoring. Last but not least, EHEIM also manufactures an LED light for aquariums since 2016

Also, a modern and seemingly unrelated domain that Eheim got indirectly involved in is the use of its aquarium pumps in the liquid-cooling systems of overclocked computers. Similarly to aquarium filters, these cooling systems require small water pumps with a low noise level and reliable continuous operation.

See also 

 Hagen

References

External links 
Eheim main webpage

Manufacturing companies of Germany